Portugal competed at the 2000 Summer Olympics in Sydney, Australia.

A delegation of 61 competitors participated in 13 sports, winning two Olympic bronze medals in the judo and athletics. Fernanda Ribeiro, the 10000m champion from Atlanta'96 and in her fourth consecutive Olympics, couldn't keep her title away from the previous holder Derartu Tulu but still managed to reach the podium. The first Portuguese medal in the judo was achieved by Nuno Delgado in the 81 kg category.

A much smaller delegation competed at these antipodean Games explaining the reduction in the athletics and swimming teams. Nevertheless, Portuguese archery and tennis had their third consecutive Olympic presence. But, as with badminton, these competitors were all eliminated in the first round (the tennis male team was beaten again by a bahamese team). Sailing provided good results with some finalists (5–8th) in distinct classes. Beach volleyball was again represented by the same Atlanta'96 fourth-placed male team. It was an almost a remake, as they faced some of the same adversaries, were beaten by an American team in the semi-finals and lost the chance to grab the bronze medal.

Medalists

Results by event

Archery

Athletics

Men
Track & road events

Field events

Combined events – Decathlon

Women
Track & road events

Field events

Badminton

Canoeing

Slalom

Cycling

Road

Men

Equestrian

Dressage

Fencing

One male fencer represented Portugal in 2000.

Judo

Men

Women

Sailing

Men's events

Women's events

Open events

Shooting

Men

Swimming

Men's 50m Freestyle:
 Pedro Silva
 Heats (heat 7) – 23.27 (→ 8th, did not advance – 36th overall)

Men's 200m Freestyle:
 Ricardo Pedroso
 Heats (heat 4) – 1:52.60 (→ 3rd, did not advance – 25th overall)

Men's 100m Butterfly:
 Simão Morgado
 Heats (heat 4) – 54.75 (→ 1st, did not advance – 30th overall)

Men's 100m Breaststroke:
 José Couto
 Heats (heat 8) – 1:02.79 (→ 7th, did not advance – 18th overall)

Men's 200m Breaststroke:
 José Couto
 Heats (heat 7) – 2:18.08 (→ 7th, did not advance – 26th overall)

Men's 100m Backstroke:
 Nuno Laurentino
 Heats (heat 4) – 56.95 (→ 5th, did not advance – 28th overall)

Men's 200m Backstroke:
 Mário Carvalho
 Heats (heat 2) – 2:03.82 (→ 2nd, did not advance – 30th overall)

Women's 200m Butterfly:
 Raquel Felgueiras
 Heats (heat 2) – 2:15.19 (→ 5th, did not advance – 27th overall)

Tennis

Volleyball

Beach

Officials
 Manuel Marques da Silva (chief of mission)

Notes

Sydney Organising Committee for the Olympic Games (2001). Official Report of the XXVII Olympiad – Volume 2: Celebrating the Games. (Retrieved 14 November 2006).
Sydney Organising Committee for the Olympic Games (2001). Official Report of the XXVII Olympiad – Volume 3: The Results. (Retrieved 14 November 2006).
International Olympic Committee – Olympic medal winners database

References

Nations at the 2000 Summer Olympics
2000 Summer Olympics
Summer Olympics